A list of films produced in South Korea in 1988:

External links
1988 in South Korea

 1980-1989 at www.koreanfilm.org

1988
South Korean
1988 in South Korea